Ovituua is a settlement in the Epukiro Constituency of the Omaheke Region in Namibia.

Populated places in the Omaheke Region